Neander Hickman Rice (January 26, 1814 – February 8, 1886) served as the 17th Secretary of State of Alabama from 1873 to 1874.

Born in Kentucky, Rice moved to Lauderdale County, Alabama in 1839, and was elected Mayor of Florence, Alabama.

References

Alabama Republicans
Secretaries of State of Alabama
1814 births
1886 deaths
Politicians from Florence, Alabama
Mayors of places in Alabama